Sim Min-kyung is a South Korean singer known professionally as Sim Soo-bong. When she was a senior at Myongji University, she debuted in 1978 through MBC College Song Contest at which she performed her self-composed song "Geuddae Geu Saram". She was one of the witnesses of the 1979 assassination of South Korean president Park Chung-hee.

Personal life
She was born to a Korean traditional folk song collector, Sim Jae-deok, who was a Korean traditional music lecturer in Ewha Womans University. He died when Sim was 3 years old. Her uncle, Sim Sa-geon, was a Pansori singer and her aunt, Sim Hwa-yeong, was a traditional dancer, Seungmu. Her mother had been a student of her father.

Sim learned to play the piano when she was an elementary school student in Seosan, and later she came to Seoul and attended Eunro Elementary School in Heukseok-dong after her mother had been divorced from a second husband. By 13, she was adept at playing drum, piano, and guitar.

At that time, she suffered from an unknown disease causing her to quit school. She retreated to a small island near Incheon, and her mother devoted herself to a new cult. She graduated from Inhwa Women's High School in Incheon.

Career as a singer

She met trot singer Nah Hoon-ah in 1975 who was a top singer at that time. Nah was impressed by her singing and introduced to Sinsegi Records but her album was not able to come out to the market because the record company did not think that it would be successful.

In 1976, Sim applied to Sookmyung Women's University as a composition major but was rejected. In the following year, she was admitted to Myongji University with a major of Business Administration.

In 1978, when she was 23, she appeared with her own song she wrote in MBC College Song Contest, and immediately she got media attention. That year, she made a huge success with her first record which was a new-style trot music.

After witnessing the assassination of Park Chung-hee

She was one of the witnesses of the 1979 assassination of South Korean president Park Chung-hee. Park was a fan of Sim, and Sim had performed for the former president before the assassination. For being a witness to the incident, she was banned from television until 1984. She has said that she was present at his banquet three times. In an interview given during later years, she contested a misconception that he was a fan of enka. When she sang a song by Misora Hibari ("Kanashii Sake"), President Park yelled angrily, "Who brought a Japanese girl?" For the first time, she discussed the incident to the Japanese press in November 2006. Her interview was published in the Asahi Shimbun.

In 2012 Sim admitted that, after the assassination, she had been incarcerated in a prison and then held in a mental institution for nearly a month, before she was released.  She was banned from TV and radio until 1981, and was kept under observation for many years.

Awards
KBS: Rookie of the year, 1979
MBC: Top 10 singers of the year, 1979
11th Mnet Asian Music Awards: Hall of Fame Award, 2009
Hanteo Awards: Album Award (Trot), 2010 and 2013

References 
 

Trot singers
South Korean women singers
South Korean Roman Catholics
Cheongsong Sim clan
1955 births
Living people